Minuscule 635 (in the Gregory-Aland numbering), α 161 (von Soden), is a Greek minuscule manuscript of the New Testament, on parchment. Palaeographically it has been assigned to the 11th century. The manuscript has complex contents. Formerly it was labeled by 173a and 211p.
It has marginalia.

Description 

The codex contains the text of the Acts of the Apostles, Catholic epistles, Pauline epistles, on 243 parchment leaves (size ). The end of the Hebrews was supplied in the 16th century. It is written in one column per page, 22 lines per page.

The order of books: Acts of the Apostles, Catholic epistles, and Pauline epistles. Epistle to the Hebrews is placed after Epistle to Philemon.

1 John 5 is said to have the Comma Johanneum in the margin in this manuscript, but Elijah Hixson has shown that it does not on the Evangelical Textual Criticism blogsite.

Text 

Kurt Aland the Greek text of the codex did not place it in any Category.
Tregelles suggested that it is probably the same copy as Minuscule 83, the readings ascribed to it being extracted from the margin of that manuscript.

History 

The manuscript is dated by the INTF to the 11th century.

The manuscript was added to the list of New Testament manuscripts by Johann Martin Augustin Scholz, who slightly examined the manuscript (173 on Scholz's list).

Formerly it was labeled by 173a and 211p. In 1908 Gregory gave the number 635 to it.

The manuscript currently is housed at the Biblioteca Nazionale (Ms. II. A. 8), at Naples.

See also 

 List of New Testament minuscules
 Biblical manuscript
 Textual criticism

References

Further reading 

Greek New Testament minuscules
11th-century biblical manuscripts